The 1966 United States Senate election in Mississippi was held on November 8, 1966. 

Incumbent James Eastland, who first entered the Senate on 1941, was re-elected to a fifth term in office. He was challenged by U.S. Representative Prentiss Walker. Walker was the first Republican elected to Congress from Mississippi since Reconstruction and was also the first such competitive Senate candidate.

Democratic primary

Candidates
 James Eastland, incumbent Senator
 Charles P. Mosby, candidate for Mississippi's 5th congressional district in 1964
 Clifton Whitley, reverend and black civil rights leader

Results

Republican primary

Candidates
 Prentiss Walker, U.S. Representative from Mississippi's 4th congressional district

Results
Walker was unopposed for the Republican nomination.

Independents and third parties

Mississippi Freedom Democratic
 Clifton Whitley, reverend and civil rights leader
Reverend Clifton Whitley also ran for the Mississippi Freedom Democratic Party. A sore-loser law was invoked against Whitley, who had also run in the Democratic primary against Eastland. He only won his case one week before the election, thereby preventing to enter any serious campaign or fundraising.

General election

Campaign
Eastland cast the civil rights movement with the tar of Communism and Black Power and raised the bloody shirt of Reconstruction against the candidacy of Walker. He was supported by segregationists Thomas Pickens Brady, George Wallace and Leander Perez.

Walker, who voted against the Civil Rights Act of 1964, ran on the right of Eastland and solely focused on the white vote, accusing him of not being hard enough in opposing integration and being friendly with President Johnson, accusations to which Eastland partisans opposed the fact Walker nominated a black constituent, Marvell Lang, to the Air Force Academy. Walker proudly announced he went to a meeting of the Americans for the Preservation of the White Race, a Ku Klux Klan front, enabling Eastland to proudly announce he was opposed by both the Klan and the AFL–CIO.

Results
Most of the White voters stayed with Eastland, and Walker ironically won African-Americans in southwestern Mississippi who wanted to cast a protest vote against Eastland.

Years later, Wirt Yerger, the chairman of the Mississippi Republican Party in the 1960s, said that Walker's decision to relinquish his House seat after one term for the vagaries of a Senate race against Eastland was "very devastating" to the growth of the GOP in Mississippi.

See also 
 1966 United States Senate elections

References 

1966
Mississippi
United States Senate